Mohamed El Hadi Boulaouidet  (born May 5, 1990 in Constantine) is an Algerian footballer who currently plays for AS Aïn M'lila. He primarily as a forward.

Club career
In June 2015, Boulaouidet joined JS Kabylie, signing a two-year contract with the club.

References

External links
 
 

1990 births
Living people
Algerian footballers
Algerian Ligue Professionnelle 1 players
Algerian Ligue 2 players
CS Constantine players
JS Kabylie players
Footballers from Constantine, Algeria
US Chaouia players
Association football forwards
NA Hussein Dey players
Expatriate footballers in Saudi Arabia
Algerian expatriate sportspeople in Saudi Arabia
Saudi Professional League players
Ohod Club players
21st-century Algerian people
ASO Chlef players
Algeria international footballers
JS Saoura players